Gilberto Pavan (Conegliano, 13 October 1986) is an Italian rugby union player.
His usual position was as a Centre and he played for Viadana in Top12, until 2020−2021 season.

In 2010-11 and 2011–12 Celtic League (Pro12) seasons, he played for Aironi.

References

External links 
It's Rugby English Profile
ESPN Profile

People from Conegliano
Italian rugby union players
1986 births
Living people
Rugby union centres
Sportspeople from the Province of Treviso
Benetton Rugby players
Rugby Viadana players
Aironi players